Peter Hans Docter (born October 9, 1968) is an American animator, film director, screenwriter, producer, voice actor, and chief creative officer of Pixar. He is best known for directing the Pixar animated feature films Monsters, Inc. (2001), Up (2009), Inside Out (2015), and Soul (2020), and as a key figure and collaborator at Pixar. He has been nominated for nine Oscars and has won three for Best Animated Feature—for Up, Inside Out and Soul—making him the first person in history to win the category three times. He has also been nominated for nine Annie Awards (winning six), a BAFTA Children's Film Award and a Hochi Film Award. He has described himself as a "geeky kid from Minnesota who likes to draw cartoons".

Early life
Docter was born in Bloomington, Minnesota, the son of Rita Margaret (Kanne) and David Reinhardt Docter. His mother's family is Danish American. He grew up introverted and socially isolated, preferring to work alone and having to remind himself to connect with others. He often played in the creek beside his house, pretending to be Indiana Jones and acting out scenes. A junior-high classmate later described him as "this kid who was really tall, but who was kind of awkward, maybe getting picked on by the school bullies because his voice change at puberty was very rough."

Both his parents worked in education: his mother, Rita, taught music and his father, Dave, was a choral director at Normandale Community College. He attended Nine Mile Elementary School, Oak Grove Junior High, and John F. Kennedy High School in Bloomington. Unlike his two sisters, Kirsten Docter, who was the violist and a founding member of the Cavani String Quartet, and Kari Docter, a cellist with the Metropolitan Opera, Docter was not particularly interested in music, although he learned to play the double bass and played with the orchestras for the soundtracks of Monsters, Inc. and Up.

Docter taught himself cartooning, making flip books and homemade animated shorts with a family movie camera. He later described his interest in animation as a way to "play God", making up nearly living characters. Cartoon director Chuck Jones, producer Walt Disney, and cartoonist Jack Davis were major inspirations.

He spent about a year at the University of Minnesota studying both philosophy and making art before transferring to the California Institute of the Arts, where he won a Student Academy Award for his production "Next Door" and graduated in 1990. Although Docter had planned to work for Walt Disney Animation Studios, his best offers came from Pixar and from the producers of The Simpsons. He did not think much of Pixar at that time, and later considered his choice to work there a strange and unusual one.

Career

Before joining Pixar, Docter had created three non-computer animations, Next Door, Palm Springs, and Winter. All three shorts were later preserved by the Academy Film Archive. He was a fan of the company's early short films, but he knew nothing about them otherwise. He commented in an October 2009 interview, "Looking back, I kind of go, what was I thinking?"

He started at Pixar in 1990 at the age of 21 after John Lasseter asked his former classmate the late Joe Ranft, who was one of Docter's teachers at CalArts, to recommend any students who would be a good fit for the company. Deciding to follow his instincts and what "felt right" at the time, he accepted the job offer from then obscure Pixar and began work there the day after his college graduation as the tenth employee at the company's animation group and its third animator. Docter instantly felt at home in the tight-knit atmosphere of the company. He has said, "Growing up ... a lot of us felt we were the only person in the world who had this weird obsession with animation. Coming to Pixar you feel like, 'Oh! There are others!'"

Docter had been brought in with limited responsibilities, but John Lasseter quickly assigned him larger and larger roles in writing, animation, sound recording, and orchestra scoring. He was one of the three key screenwriters behind the concept of Toy Story, and partially based the character of Buzz Lightyear on himself. He had a mirror on his desk and made faces with it as he conceptualized the character.

Docter's fascination with character development was further influenced by a viewing of Paper Moon, he told journalist Robert K. Elder in an interview for The Film That Changed My Life.

I like the more character-driven stuff, and Paper Moon brought that home to me in a way that I had not seen in live action, really focusing on the whole story just about characters. It was almost theatrical in the same way you might see a stage show because you're locked in a room. It's got to be about characters, and yet it was so cinematic, a film that couldn't be done in any other medium. It just kind of blew my socks off.

Docter has been an integral part of some of Pixar's most seminal works, including Toy Story, Toy Story 2, A Bug's Life and Monsters, Inc., all of which received critical acclaim and honors. He contributed to these animated films as a co-author to the scripts, and worked with CGI stalwarts such as John Lasseter, Ronnie del Carmen, Bob Peterson, Andrew Stanton, Brad Bird, and Joe Ranft. Docter has referred to his colleagues at Pixar as a bunch of "wild stallions". He is also one of the five founding members of the Pixar Braintrust, which came together during the making of Toy Story (the other four being Lasseter, Stanton, Ranft and Unkrich).

Docter made his directorial debut with Monsters, Inc.—the first Pixar film not directed by Lasseter—which occurred right after the birth of his first child, Nick. Docter has said that the abrupt move from a complete, single-minded devotion to his career to parenting drove him "upside down" and formed the inspiration for the storyline. In 2004, he was asked by John Lasseter to direct the English translation of Howl's Moving Castle. Docter then directed the 2009 film Up, released on May 29, 2009. He based the protagonist of Up partially on himself, based on his frequent feelings of social awkwardness and his desire to get away from crowds to contemplate. Following the success of Up, Docter and fellow Pixar veterans John Lasseter, Andrew Stanton and Lee Unkrich as well as long-time collaborator and director Brad Bird were honored with the Golden Lion Honorary Award for Lifetime Achievement at the 66th Venice International Film Festival. Docter directed the 2015 film Inside Out to critical acclaim. His next film, Soul, was released on Disney+ on December 25, 2020 to critical acclaim.

Docter appeared at Comic-Con 2008 and the 2009 WonderCon.

In May 2009, Docter remarked retrospectively to Christianity Today that he had lived "a blessed life" so far. The A.V. Club has called him "almost universally successful". He has been nominated for eight Oscars (winning three), three Annie Awards (winning two), four BAFTA Film Awards (winning two), a British Academy Children's Award (which he won), and a Hochi Film Award (which he won). Accepting his first Academy Award for Best Animated Feature, he said, "Never did I dream that making a flip book out of my third-grade math book would lead to this." Docter served as Vice-President of Creativity at Pixar Animation Studios through June 2018, and following John Lasseter stepping down from the role, became the studio's chief creative officer. TheWrap reported that Docter planned to complete the film he was currently working on, which ultimately became Soul.

Doctor is expected to receive the Winsor McCay Award at the 2023 Annie Awards ceremony along with fellow animators Craig McCracken and Evelyn Lambart, for his "unparalleled achievement and exceptional contributions to animation".

Personal life
Docter is married to Amanda Docter and has two children, Nicholas and Elie. Elie has a speaking part in Up and was the inspiration for the character of Riley in Inside Out.

Docter is a fan of anime, particularly the work of Hayao Miyazaki. Docter has said that Miyazaki's animation has "beautifully observed little moments of truth that you just recognize and respond to". He is a fan of the work done by his competitors at DreamWorks as well. Referring to the competitive environment, he has said: "I think it's a much healthier environment when there is more diversity".

During an interview in 2009, Docter confirmed that he is a Christian and said that it influences his work. However, he went on to say that he did not envision himself ever creating a Christian film. About the relationship between his faith and his filmmaking, Docter has said:

Filmography

Films

Shorts and series 
{| class="wikitable"
|-
! Year
! Title
!Director
!Writer
!ExecutiveProducer
!Animator
!Other
! Role
! Notes
|-
| 1985
| Behind the Scenes at Camelot
| 
| 
| 
| 
| 
| Himself
|
|-
| 1988
| Winter
| 
| 
| 
| 
| 
|
| Written by
|-
| rowspan=2 | 1989
| Palm Springs
| 
| 
| 
| 
| 
| Sigmond Dinosaur
|
|-
| Cranium Command
| 
| 
| 
| 
| 
|
|
|-
| 1990
| Next Door
| 
| 
| 
| 
| 
| Old Man
| Composer
|-
| 1997
| Geri's Game
| 
| 
| 
| 
| 
|
|
|-
| 2002
| Mike's New Car
| 
| 
| 
| 
| 
|
|
|-
|2005
| Mr. Incredible and Pals 
| 
| 
| 
| 
| 
| Mr. Incredible
|
|-
| rowspan=3 | 2009
| Dug's Special Mission 
| 
| 
| 
| 
| 
|
|
|-
| George and A.J.
| 
| 
| 
| 
| 
|
|
|-
| Let's Pollute
| 
| 
| 
| 
| 
|
| Musician: Bass
|-
| 2013
| Party Central
| 
| 
| 
| 
| 
|
|
|-
| 2015
| Riley's First Date?
| 
| 
| 
| 
| 
| Dad's Anger
|
|-
| 2017
| | Lou
| 
| 
| 
| 
| 
|
|
|-
| 2018
| | Bao
| 
| 
| 
| 
| 
|
|
|-
! colspan=9 | Disney+ Original Short Films, Series, and Specials
|-
| 2019–20
| Forky Asks a Question
| 
| 
| 
| 
| 
|
| 
|-
| rowspan=3 | 2020
| Loop
| 
| 
| 
| 
| 
|
| Story Trust
|-
| Lamp Life (film)|Lamp Life| 
| 
| 
| 
| 
|
| 
|-
| Dory's Reef Cam| 
| 
| 
| 
| 
|
| 
|-
| rowspan=2 | 2021
| Pixar Popcorn| 
| 
| 
| 
| 
|
| 
|-
| 22 vs. Earth| 
| 
| 
| 
| 
|
| 
|-
| 2021-23
| Dug Days| 
| 
| 
| 
| 
|
|
|-
| 2023
| Win or Lose| 
| 
| 
| 
| 
|
| 
|}

 Other credits 
{| class="wikitable"
|-
! Year
! Title
! Role
|-
| 2003
| Boundin'| rowspan=2 | Special Thanks
|-
| rowspan=2 | 2007
| Fog City Mavericks|-
| The Pixar Story| Himself; Very Special Thanks
|-
| 2008
| Presto| rowspan=6 | Special Thanks
|-
| 2009
| Partly Cloudy|-
| 2010
| Day & Night|-
| 2011
| La Luna|-
| 2013
| The Blue Umbrella|-
| rowspan=2 | 2014
| Lava|-
| Toy Story That Time Forgot| Extra Special Thanks
|-
| 2015
| Sanjay's Super Team| rowspan=2 | Special Thanks
|-
| 2016
| Piper|-
| 2017
| Baby Driver| Special Thanks - uncredited
|-
| rowspan=5 | 2019
| Purl| rowspan=14 | Special Thanks
|-
| Kitbull|-
| Float|-
| Frozen II|-
| Wind|-
| rowspan=5 | 2020
| Out|-
| One Night in Miami...|-
| Borat Subsequent Moviefilm|-
| Canvas|-
| Burrow|-
| 2020–2021
| Inside Pixar|-
| rowspan=6 | 2021
| Monsters at Work|-
| Twenty Something|-
| Nona|-
| A Spark Story| Himself; Special Thanks
|-
| Ciao Alberto| Special Thanks
|-
| Pixar 2021 Disney+ Day Special| Himself
|-
| rowspan="3" | 2022
| Embrace the Panda: Making 'Turning Red'| Special Thanks
|-
| Beyond Infinity: Buzz and the Journey to 'Lightyear'| Himself; Special Thanks
|-
|Cars on the Road|Special Thanks
|}

Reception
Critical, public and commercial reception to films Docter has directed as of January 9, 2021.

Awards and nominations

Academy Awards

!
|-
! scope="row"| 1995
| Toy Story| Best Original Screenplay
| 
| style="text-align:center;"|
|-
! scope="row"| 2001
| Monsters, Inc.| Best Animated Feature
| 
| style="text-align:center;"|
|-
! scope="row"| 2002
| Mike's New Car| Best Animated Short Film
| 
| style="text-align:center;"|
|-
! scope="row"| 2008
| WALL-E| rowspan="1"| Best Original Screenplay
| 
| style="text-align:center;"|
|-
! rowspan="2" scope="row"| 2009
| rowspan="2"| Up| rowspan="1"| Best Animated Feature
| 
| rowspan="2" style="text-align:center;"|
|-
| rowspan="1"| Best Original Screenplay
| 
|-
! rowspan="2" scope="row"| 2015
| rowspan="2"| Inside Out| rowspan="1"| Best Animated Feature
| 
| rowspan="2" style="text-align:center;"|
|-
| Best Original Screenplay
| 
|-
! scope="row"| 2020
| rowspan="2"| Soul| rowspan="1"| Best Animated Feature
| 
| rowspan="2" style="text-align:center;"|
|}

Annie Awards

!
|-
! scope="row"| 1996
| Toy Story| Best Individual Achievement in Animation
| 
| style="text-align:center;"|
|-
! scope="row"| 2000
| Toy Story 2| Outstanding Achievement in Writing
| 
| style="text-align:center;"|
|-
! scope="row"| 2002
| Monsters, Inc.| Directing in a Feature Production
| 
| style="text-align:center;"|
|-
! rowspan="2" scope="row"| 2010
| rowspan="2" | Up| Directing in a Feature Production
| 
| style="text-align:center;"|
|-
| Writing in a Feature Production
| 
| style="text-align:center;"|
|-
! rowspan="2" scope="row"| 2016
| rowspan="2"| Inside Out| Directing in a Feature Production
| 
| style="text-align:center;"|
|-
| Writing in a Feature Production
| 
| style="text-align:center;"|
|-
! rowspan="2" scope="row"| 2021
| rowspan="2"| Soul| Directing in a Feature Production
| 
| style="text-align:center;"|
|-
| Writing in a Feature Production
| 
| style="text-align:center;"|
|}

Other awards

 Collaborators (actors) 
Pete Docter has cast certain actors and crew members in more than one of the films he has directed

See also
List of Pixar films
List of Pixar staff

References

External links

 
 Pixar Animation Studios website
 Radio interview on Fresh Air'' (21 mins, 2009)
 Peter Docter is interviewed by Diana Seyb and shows one of his early cartoons just as he was heading out to California to work in the animation industry,  Northern Lights TV Series #135 (1990)

1968 births
Animators from Minnesota
American animated film directors
American animated film producers
American chief executives
American chief executives in the media industry
American Christians
American film studio executives
American male voice actors
American people of Danish descent
American storyboard artists
American voice directors
Animation screenwriters
Annie Award winners
California Institute of the Arts alumni
Directors of Best Animated Feature Academy Award winners
Disney executives
Disney people
Film directors from Minnesota
Hugo Award-winning writers
Living people
Male actors from Minnesota
Nebula Award winners
People from Bloomington, Minnesota
Pixar people
University of Minnesota College of Liberal Arts alumni